Bal Ganesh is a 2007 computer-animated musical feature film directed by Pankaj Sharma.  The film is about the adventures and hijinks of Lord Ganesh, the Hindu elephant-headed god, when he was a kid.

Plot 
Shiva and Parvati live on Mount Kailash. One day, Parvati asks Nandi to guard the palace and prevent any visitors from coming in while she takes her bath. Shiva enters the palace anyways, which upsets Parvati. She wants an attendant of her own who would obey her above all else. While she is bathing, she creates a mold from sandalwood paste. Her love and prayers give the mold life, and he comes to life as Ganesh. As a child, Ganesh is playful, engaging in mischief with Nandi.

One day, Parvati asks Ganesh to guard the palace while she bathes, and he promises not to let anybody in. When Shiva comes by, Ganesh does not allow him in because he will not disobey his mother under any circumstances. Even Brahma is unable to get Ganesh to budge. Shiva begins his tandava in extreme anger. From the ocean, Vishnu and Lakshmi decide to go to Kailash to calm Shiva down. They arrive to Kailash just as Shiva cuts off Ganesh's head with his trident.

When Parvati hears what Shiva did, she tells Shiva that she wants her son to come back to life or else she will give up her life, too. Because Shiva's trident is all powerful, Brahma says the only way to bring Ganesh back to life is to attach the head of another child onto Ganesh's body. Shiva orders his attendants to bring him the head of another child so they can revive Ganesh.Shiva's attendants come back with the head of a baby elephant. They attach the head and Ganesh comes back to life. Parvati becomes sad thinking that everyone will mock him, but Brahma promises that for eras to come, people will worship Ganesh. Lakshmi gives a boon that Ganesh will be worshipped at the beginning of any auspicious occasion, and Vishnu gives a boon that Ganesh will be the symbol of wisdom and wealth, and that everyone will offer him ladoos. Shiva appoints him the head of his warrior army.

Ganesh grows up an engages in mischief with Mooshak (his vahana) and Nandi. One day, Parshuram comes to visit Shiva, and Ganesh tells him he cannot because Shiva is amidst prayer. In anger, Parshuram throws a weapon at Ganesh, which breaks his tusk.

One time, a demon named Surkdaman pleases Shiva with his devotion, so Shiva offers him a boon. Surkdaman asks for the power so that no entity can defeat him. With his invincibility, the demon begins to torment the gods in the heavens and holds them hostage. Surkdaman threatens Varun to stop bringing rainclouds to South India because Indra is hiding somewhere there. Without rain, South India suffers from a drought, and Sage Agastya prays to Brahma to bring an end to Surkdaman's torment. Pleased with Agastya's devotion, Brahma appears and advises Agastya to visit Shiva in Kailash, as Ganga flows from Shiva's hair. Shiva gives Agastya holy water from Ganga. Ganesha is intrigued by the sage and secretly follows him back to South India. Back in South India, when Agastya sits for rest, Ganesh becomes impatient and worries for the animals and people living without water. Ganesh disguises himself as a crow and tips over the pot with the holy water. Agastya becomes angry and begins cursing the crow, so he transforms into Ganesh again and shows Agastya a flowing river emerging from the fallen pot of water. Ganesh promises Agastya that water will flow from this River Kaveri for years to come.

Ganesh loves his little brother Kartikeya, who is a fierce warrior. One day, Narad sets up a competition between the two brothers to see who is more powerful. He challenges them both to circle the world three times; whichever brother completes the task first will be deemed the winner. Ganesh circles around his parents three times, explaining to Narad that his parents are the world. He gives the winning garland to Kartikeya, impressed by his strength.

One night, Ganesh is riding on Mooshak, who trips on a snake and causes Ganesh to fall. Chandra laughs at the incident, mocking Ganesh's large belly. Ganesh curses him that he will never shine bright again. Chandra begs for forgiveness, and Ganesh explains to him that it is not becoming of a deity to make fun of others' appearance. Ganesh cannot undo the curse, but tells Chandra that his light will gradually appear and disappear.

Kuber comes to Kailash to invite Shiva and Parvati to visit his palace for a dinner. Shiva realizes that Kuber only wants to show off his wealth, so he declines the invitation. Shiva tells Kuber that Ganesh can visit, and so Ganesh goes back with Kuber to his palace. There, Ganesh keeps eating and Kuber becomes scared he will run out of food. He apologizes to Shiva for becoming prideful about his wealth, having learned his lesson.

One day, Tarkasur challenges Kartikeya in a battle. Ganesh says that Kartikeya will destroy the demon. Kartikeya battles Tarkasur, and with Ganesh's help, defeats him in battle.

Voice cast
 Ashar Shaikh as Bal Ganesh
 Adarsh Gautam as Lord Shiva
 Namrata Sawhney as Parvati
 Jai Prakash Singh as Lord Brahma, kuber, snake
 Jignesh as Lord Vishnu/ Lord Narayana
 Neshma Mantri as Lakshmi
 Taran as Bal Kartikeya
 Dhananjay as Varun Dev
 Pankaj Sharma as Tevaraj Indra Dev
 Rajanika Ganguli as Mooshak
 Jitendra Jaiswal as Nanti
 Mihir Chakraborty as Agastaya The sage
 Nitin Malhotra as Narad The sage
 Bharat Swatantra as Tarkasur
 Vikas Goswami as Parshuram
 Parminder Ghumman as Surapdaman

Soundtrack 
Soundtrack was composed by Shamir Tandon.
Aao Sunaata Hoon Sabko - Hariharan 
Ganaa Ganaa Di - Shankar Mahadevan
Haathi Ka Bal Hai - Sanchita Bhattacharya
Adhabhut Sankalp - Hema Desai 
Nanha Munna Bal Ganesh - Asha Bhosle, Usha Mangeshkar
Shankarji IKa Damroo Baje - Kailash Kher
Teeno Lok Me Pooja Jaye - Asha Bhosle, Amaanat, Aneek

Critical reception
Ameeta Gupta of Rediff.com gave the film 2.5/5, writing "Overall, Bal Ganesh is a good effort, and worth a watch." Taran Adarsh of Bollywood Hungama gave the film 2.5 stars out of 5, writing "On the whole, BAL GANESH is an interesting celluloid experience that should attract kids by the dozens."

Sequels
A  sequel directed by Vijay S. Bhanushali, Bal Ganesh 2, released on 23 October 2009. Another direct-to-video sequel by Bhanushali, Bal Ganesh 3, was released on 18 September 2015. The film Bal Ganesh and the PomZom Planet, also by Bhanushali followed in 2017. A web series, titled Bal Ganesh Ki Paathshala, was released in 2020 which shows Ganesha explaining various Indian festivals and traditions to kids.

See also
List of Indian animated feature films

References

External links
 Official website
 

Indian animated films
2000s Hindi-language films
2007 animated films
2007 films
Films scored by Shamir Tandon
2007 computer-animated films
Hindu mythological films
Indian children's films
2000s children's animated films
Ganesha in popular culture
Indian mythology in popular culture
Films about Tibet